Sakharov is a 1984 American drama film directed by Jack Gold and written by David W. Rintels. The film stars Jason Robards, Glenda Jackson, Nicol Williamson, Frank Finlay, Michael Bryant and Paul Freeman. The film premiered on HBO on June 20, 1984.

Plot

Cast 
Jason Robards as Andrei Sakharov
Glenda Jackson as Yelena Bonner
Nicol Williamson as Malyarov
Frank Finlay as Kravtsov
Michael Bryant as Syshchikov
Paul Freeman as Pavel Leontiev
Anna Massey as Klavdia 
Joe Melia as Sergej Kovalov
Lee Montague as Slavsky
Jim Norton as Roy Medvedev
Valentine Pelka as Efrem Sakharov
Catherine Hall as Tanya Sakharov
John McAndrew as Alyosha Sakharov
Debbie Farrington as Lisa Sakharov
David Midwinter as Matvel Sakharov, age 10
Craig Dickerson as Matvel Sakharov, age 5
Toni Warwick as Anya Sakharov
Eileen Way as Ruf Grigorievna
Denyse Alexander as Dr. Lydia
Marion Bailey as Ludmilla Kovalov
Anton Lesser as Valery Chalidze

References

External links
 

1984 television films
1984 films
1984 drama films
HBO Films films
Films directed by Jack Gold
Films scored by Carl Davis
Films shot in Austria
Films shot in London
American drama television films
1980s English-language films
1980s American films